Garage Classical is a compilation album by British disc jockey DJ Spoony with Katie Chatburn and the Ignition Orchestra, released on 18 October 2019, on the Since 93 label. The album contains orchestral covers of classic UK garage tracks and features appearances from Paloma Faith, Sugababes, Lily Allen, Emeli Sandé, Gabrielle, So Solid Crew and more.

The album was preceded by the release of two promotional singles, "Moving Too Fast" featuring Paloma Faith and "Sweet Like Chocolate" featuring Lily Allen. "Flowers" featuring Sugababes was the only single to chart, reaching No. 22 in Scotland and No. 26 on the UK Dance Singles Chart.

Background and promotion
On 28 August 2019, during an interview with Official Charts Company, the DJ announced the album and talked about the artists he was collaborating with stating "I know Sugababes' Mutya and Keisha personally because they are huge garage fans. They were always out in the garage clubs, but at the same time, they were huge pop stars and the biggest girl band in the country."

The album was released on CD format on 18 October 2019, followed by 2xLP on 6 December 2019.

Live
A live show was performed on 24 October 2019 at the Royal Albert Hall.

Track listing

Charts

Release history

See also
Garage Classics

References

2019 compilation albums
UK garage albums
Covers albums